The National Assembly is the lower house of the Parliament of Madagascar. The Assembly has 151 members, elected for five-year terms in single-member and two-member constituencies.

The Parliament of Madagascar has two chambers. The other chamber is the Senate (Antenimieran-Doholona/Sénat), which has 33 members, 22 of which are indirectly elected (one from each district of Madagascar), with 11 more being appointed.

Recent election results

Members as of 2014

See also
List of presidents of the National Assembly of Madagascar

References

External links
 

Madagascar
Government of Madagascar
1958 establishments in Madagascar